Korczak is a Polish coat of arms. It was used by several noble families of Clan Korczak in the times of the Kingdom of Poland and the Polish–Lithuanian Commonwealth.

History

The coat of arms has Hungarian origins; the three bars represent the Danube, Tisza (or Drava), and Sava rivers. Earliest mention – 1142 annum (Ogród królewski, Paprocki Bartłomiej, D. Siedlczański, Praga, 1599).
The first mention of the coat of arms was 1368, while the oldest known seal bearing the coat dates to 1432. The Gorajscy family was the first to use the seal.

Bearers are largely made up of noble families from Red Ruthenia and Lesser Poland. The arms were confirmed in Lithuania at Union of Horodło (1413).

Blazon

Notable bearers
Notable bearers of this coat of arms include:
 Komorowski family
 Tadeusz Bór-Komorowski, Inspector General of the Armed Forces of Poland
 Countess Anna Maria Komorowska, mother of Queen Mathilde of Belgium
 Gertruda Komorowska
 Branicki family
 Franciszek Ksawery Branicki
 Katarzyna Branicka
 Jan Andrzej Prochnicki Biskup Kamieniecki i protektor zakonu kawalerów maltańskich na terenie Rzeczypospolitej. Fundator kolegium jezuitów w Kamieńcu Podolskim. W 1614 został przeniesiony na stanowisko arcybiskupa lwowskiego
 Władysław Grzegorz Branicki
 Zofia Branicka
 Bronisław Komorowski, Incumbent and Acting President of Poland (in fact of the Dołęga coat of arms)
 Janusz Korczak-Ziolkowski Polish-British artist
 Ivan Horbachevsky (1854-1942) — Ukrainian chemist and politician. First Health minister of Austria-Hungary
 Maria Zankovetska (1854-1934) — Ukrainian theater actress
 Yosyf Shumlyansky (18643-1708) — Eastern Catholic (previously Orthodox) bishop of the Eparchy of Lviv, Halych and Kamianets-Podilskyi
 Aleksandra Ziolkowska-Boehm
 Korczak Ziolkowski
 Dymitr z Goraja
 Jerzy Wołodyjowski, on whom the fictional Michał Wołodyjowski is based
 Boris Korczak

Gallery

See also
 Polish heraldry
 Heraldic family
 List of Polish nobility coats of arms
 Korczak Ziolkowski

Bibliography
 Tadeusz Gajl: Herbarz polski od średniowiecza do XX wieku : ponad 4500 herbów szlacheckich 37 tysięcy nazwisk 55 tysięcy rodów. L&L, 2007. .
 Ogród królewski, Paprocki Bartłomiej, D. Siedlczański, Praga, 1599 r. http://www.dbc.wroc.pl/dlibra/doccontent?id=2267&from=the%20PIONIER%20DLF

References

Polish coats of arms
Ukrainian coats of arms